A package of constitutional reforms proposed by the Constitutional Council was held in the Marshall Islands in April 1995. In 1994 the Nitijela voted to create a Constitutional Council which would propose a raft of constitutional changes and reforms.  The Council submitted thirty-five proposals, each of which had to attain a two-thirds majority of valid votes in order to pass.  Turnout was low at 33%, and only a measure establishing the Marshallese language version of the constitution passed.  All other proposals failed to reach the two-thirds bar, and thus failed.

References

1995 referendums
1995 in the Marshall Islands
Referendums in the Marshall Islands